Marek Zuziak (born 11 January 1995) is a Slovak football striker who currently plays for MŠK Považská Bystrica.

Club career
Zuziak made his debut for MŠK Žilina against FC ViOn Zlaté Moravce on 28 April 2013.

Ahead of the 2019-20 season, Zuziak joined MŠK Považská Bystrica.

References

External links
 MŠK Žilina profile 
 Talenty-info profile 
 

1995 births
Living people
Slovak footballers
Slovak expatriate footballers
Association football forwards
MŠK Žilina players
FK Pohronie players
MŠK Púchov players
FK Iskra Borčice players
Widzew Łódź players
Slovak Super Liga players
2. Liga (Slovakia) players
II liga players
Slovak expatriate sportspeople in Poland
Expatriate footballers in Poland